Eustațiu is a Romanian male given name that may refer to:

Eustațiu Pencovici
Eustațiu Sebastian
Rear-Admiral Eustațiu Sebastian-class corvette
Eustațiu Stoenescu

Romanian masculine given names